The Université Caraïbe (Caribbean University) is a university located in Port-au-Prince, Haiti. It was founded in 1988 and is organized in six Faculties.

Organization
These are the six faculties in which the university is divided into:

 Faculty of Education
 Faculty of Engineering
 Faculty of Agriculture
 Faculty of Management
 Faculty of Information science
 Faculty of Letters and Humanities

See also 
 Port-au-Prince

External links
 Université Caraïbe Website 

Universities in Haiti
Buildings and structures in Port-au-Prince
Educational institutions established in 1988
1988 establishments in Haiti